Waterloo North was a federal electoral district represented in the House of Commons of Canada from 1867 to 1968. It was located in the province of Ontario. It was created by the British North America Act of 1867 which entitled each of north and south ridings of the County of Waterloo to elect one Member of Parliament.

The North Riding of Waterloo was defined in 1859 as consisting of the Townships of North Waterloo, Woolwich and Wellesley, and the Town of Berlin and Village of Waterloo.

In 1903, it was re-defined to consist of the townships of North Waterloo, Wellesley and Woolwich, the towns of Berlin and Waterloo, and the village of Elmira. In 1924, it was re-defined to consist of the townships of Wellesley and Woolwich, and the northern part of the township of Waterloo. In 1947, it was re-defined to consist of the city of Kitchener, the town of Waterloo and the townships of Wellesley and Woolwich, and the northern part of the township of Waterloo.

The electoral district was abolished in 1966 when it was redistributed between Kitchener, Waterloo and Wellington—Grey ridings.

Members of Parliament

Nb 1 Ministerial by-elections

Electoral history

|- 
  
|Liberal
|Isaac Erb Bowman 
|align="right"| acclaimed   
|}

|- 
  
|Liberal
|Isaac Erb Bowman 
|align="right"|acclaimed   
|}

|- 
  
|Liberal
|Isaac Erb Bowman 
|align="right"| acclaimed   
|}

|- 
  
|Conservative
|Hugo Kranz 
|align="right"|1,412   
  
|Liberal
|Isaac Erb Bowman 
|align="right"| 1,279
|}

|- 
  
|Conservative
|Hugo Kranz  
|align="right"|1,459 
 
|Unknown
|D. S. Bowlby
|align="right"| 1,402   
|}

|- 
  
|Liberal
|Isaac Erb Bowman 
|align="right"| 2,080
  
|Conservative
|Hugo Kranz 
|align="right"|1,841   
|}

|- 
  
|Liberal
|Isaac Erb Bowman  
|align="right"| 2,289 || 50.95
  
|Conservative
|Hugo Kranz 
|align="right"| 2,204    || 49.05
|}

|- 
  
|Conservative
|Joseph E. Seagram
|align="right"| 2,706    
  
|Liberal
|E. W. R. Snider
|align="right"|  2,397  
|}

|- 
  
|Conservative
|Joseph E. Seagram
|align="right"| acclaimed    
|}

|- 
  
|Conservative
|Joseph E. Seagram
|align="right"| 2,769   
  
|Liberal
|Edwin P. Clement
|align="right"| 2,463   
|}

|- 
  
|Liberal
|William Daum Euler
|align="right"| 7,466 

|}

|- 
  
|Liberal
|William Daum Euler 
|align="right"|8,868 
  
|Conservative
|Edwin Hamilton Scully
|align="right"| 4,657   
|}

|- 
  
|Liberal
|William Daum Euler 
|align="right"|10,394 
  
|Conservative
|David Gross
|align="right"| 6,365 
|}

|- 
  
|Liberal
|William Daum Euler
|align="right"| acclaimed   
|}

|- 
  
|Liberal
|William Daum Euler
|align="right"|12,785
  
|Conservative
|Karl Kenneth Homuth  
|align="right"| 9,732   
|}

|- 
  
|Liberal
|William Daum Euler
|align="right"|12,832 
  
|Conservative
|Charles Casper Hahn
|align="right"| 4,084
 
|Co-operative Commonwealth
|John Walter 
|align="right"| 3,313 
|}

|- 
  
|Liberal
|William Daum Euler 
|align="right"|14,172 
  
|National Government
|Stanley Francis Leavine 
|align="right"| 6,694
 
|Co-operative Commonwealth
|Enoch Honsberger 
|align="right"|1,597   
|}

|- 
  
|Liberal
|Louis Orville Breithaupt 
|align="right"|8,826 
 
|Unknown
|Stanley Francis Leavine 
|align="right"|5,436   
|}

|- 
  
|Liberal
|Louis Orville Breithaupt 
|align="right"| 15,791 
  
|Progressive Conservative
|John William Bailey 
|align="right"| 7,635 
 
|Co-operative Commonwealth
|Stanton Lautenschlager
|align="right"| 4,394 

|}

|- 
  
|Liberal
|Louis Orville Breithaupt 
|align="right"| 17,715 
  
|Progressive Conservative
|Harvey J. Graber 
|align="right"| 7,229 
 
|Co-operative Commonwealth
|John S. Wagner
|align="right"| 7,141   
|}

|- 
  
|Liberal
|Norman Schneider 
|align="right"|12,436 
  
|Progressive Conservative
|Elizabeth Janzen 
|align="right"| 10,892 
 
|Co-operative Commonwealth
|Leonard Schroeder 
|align="right"| 4,701   
|}

|- 
  
|Liberal
|Norman Schneider  
|align="right"| 16,139 
  
|Progressive Conservative
|Elizabeth Janzen  
|align="right"| 10,751 
 
|Co-operative Commonwealth
|Theodore H. Isley
|align="right"| 4,654 

|}

|- 
  
|Liberal
|Norman Schneider  
|align="right"| 15,972 
  
|Progressive Conservative
|Frank Costello
|align="right"| 13,458 
 
|Co-operative Commonwealth
|Russell Honsberger 
|align="right"| 7,406 

|}

|- 
  
|Progressive Conservative
|Oscar Weichel
|align="right"| 24,526   
  
|Liberal
|Norman Schneider  
|align="right"| 15,206
 
|Co-operative Commonwealth
|Russell Honsberger 
|align="right"| 5,148   
|}

|- 
  
|Progressive Conservative
|Oscar Weichel  
|align="right"| 21,262    
  
|Liberal
|Harold Paikin 
|align="right"| 17,762 
 
|New Democratic
|Russell Honsberger
|align="right"| 7,722 

|}

|- 
  
|Progressive Conservative
|Oscar Weichel 
|align="right"|22,007   
  
|Liberal
|Donald Weber 
|align="right"| 21,366
 
|New Democratic
|John Walter 
|align="right"| 6,200 

|}

|- 
  
|Liberal
|Kieth Hymmen  
|align="right"| 24,733 
  
|Progressive Conservative
|Fred Speckeen 
|align="right"|17,790 
 
|New Democratic
|Morley Rosenberg
|align="right"|11,074 
|}

See also 

 List of Canadian federal electoral districts
 Past Canadian electoral districts

External links 

 Website of the Parliament of Canada

Former federal electoral districts of Ontario